Ritmo Deportivo (translated as Sporty Rhythm  in English) is a weekly television series airing Saturdays at 5pm/4C on Spanish-language network Telemundo, part of the NBC Deportes line of programming.  It premiered in October 2002 and is one of the longest standing alternative sports shows in Spanish language TV.

About the show
The series is hosted by Leti Coo, Karim Mendiburu and Omar Amador and is geared generally towards men ages 18 to 34. Each week's episode is filmed in different exterior locations around the United States, Mexico and around the world.

The show has a variety of content: long-form stories, technology segments, automotive profiles, video game previews and modeling vignettes. It also covers sporting events, eco-tourism, modeling contests and worldwide attractions.  Its segments are also featured in “NBC Universal on American”, a variety show of NBC Universal properties shown during American Airlines flights. The show ended it run on September 27, 2015

References

External links
Official Site
Official Facebook Page
Official Twitter Page
Deportes Telemundo iPhone, iPod Touch, and iPad App

American sports television series
Telemundo original programming
NBC Deportes
2002 American television series debuts
2015 American television series endings